Acacia moirii, commonly known as Moir's wattle, is a subshrub which is  endemic to the south-west of Western Australia. It grows to between 0.15 and 0.6 metres high and has densely hairy leaflets. The globular golden-yellow flower heads appear from May to August, followed by hairy seed pods which are around  4 cm long and 5 to 6 mm wide.

Taxonomy
The type specimen was collected near Cape Riche by A.J. Moir in 1901.

Three subspecies are currently recognised:
A. moirii subsp. dasycarpa Maslin
A. moirii E.Pritz. subsp. moirii
A. moirii subsp. recurvistipula Maslin

Distribution
The species occurs on sandplains, undulating plains, hills and rises in an area between Eneabba,  Manypeaks and Jerdacuttup as well as east of Esperance in the Cape Arid area.

See also
List of Acacia species

References

moirii
Acacias of Western Australia
Fabales of Australia
Taxa named by Ernst Pritzel
Plants described in 1904